Lëkurësi Castle is a ruined castle near Sarandë, southern Albania. The castle is on a strategic hill point overlooking the town of Sarandë, southeast of the town centre. From here one can control the whole town as well as the islands of Ksamil.

History
Lëkurësi Castle was built in 1537 by Sultan Suleiman the Magnificent of the Ottoman Empire. It was built in order to defend against the Venetians. It held a garrison of 220 soldiers as well. The region traditionally belonged to the southern part of the region of Himara. At the end of the 18th century the castle was attacked by Ali Pasha of Ioannina and the surrounding habitation raided.

The castle used to withhold the old Lëkurës village. It has a square shape with two round towers on its north-western and south-eastern corners. To climb up to the castle, visitors need to leave the main road on Qafë Gjashtë and go up the town hill from the other side of the town.

Today tourist facilities are built next to the castle (restaurant etc.) in similar architectural style.

Gallery

See also
Tourism in Albania
Albanian Riviera
History of Albania

References

Buildings and structures completed in 1537
Castles in Albania
Buildings and structures in Sarandë
1537 establishments in the Ottoman Empire
Tourist attractions in Vlorë County